François Para du Phanjas was a French Jesuit writer.

References

French Jesuits